Kopa is a village in Hiiumaa Parish, Hiiu County, on the island of Hiiumaa in Estonia. As of 2019, the village's population is 11.. As of 2011, population was 10.

Artist Kaljo Põllu (1934–2010) was born in Kopa.

References

Villages in Hiiu County